James Richard Katcavage (October 28, 1934 – February 22, 1995) was an American football defensive tackle in the National Football League (NFL) who played thirteen seasons for the New York Giants. From 1952 until 1956, Katcavage played college football at the University of Dayton and was drafted in the fourth round of the 1956 NFL Draft. Although quarterback sacks did not become an official NFL statistic until 1982, Katcavage is unofficially credited with a career total of  sacks, placing him fourth on the New York Giants' unofficial list. After retiring from playing, Katcavage served as defensive line coach for the Giants from 1969 to 1973.

In 1966, Katcavage was inducted into the University of Dayton Hall of Fame.

In 2016, the Professional Football Researchers Association named Katvavage to the PFRA Hall of Very Good Class of 2016.

Katcavage died on February 22, 1995, in Maple Glen, Pennsylvania. He was of Lithuanian descent.

References

External links

 
 University of Dayton Hall of Fame

1934 births
1995 deaths
American football defensive ends
American football defensive tackles
American people of Lithuanian descent
Dayton Flyers football players
Eastern Conference Pro Bowl players
New York Giants players
Players of American football from Pennsylvania
Sportspeople from Wilkes-Barre, Pennsylvania